Santessonia is a genus of lichenized fungi in the family Caliciaceae. The genus was circumscribed in 1978 by lichenologists Mason Hale and Gernot Vobis, with Santessonia namibensis assigned as the type species, and at that time, only species. This species, endemic to the Namib Desert, has deep depressions (lacunae) in the thallus, which are interpreted as an adaptation to take advantage of the infrequent moisture provided by fog. The genus name honours Norwegian lichenologist Rolf Santesson.

Species
 Santessonia cervicornis 
 Santessonia hereroensis 
 Santessonia lagunebergii 
 Santessonia namibensis 
 Santessonia peruviensis 
 Santessonia roccelloides 
 Santessonia sorediata

References

Teloschistales
Lichen genera
Caliciales genera
Taxa named by Mason Hale
Taxa described in 1978